Linesville Creek is a  long tributary to Shenango River and Pymatuning Reservoir in Crawford County, Pennsylvania.  The watershed is 41% forested, 54% agricultural and the rest is other uses.

See also 
 List of rivers of Pennsylvania

References

Rivers of Pennsylvania
Rivers of Crawford County, Pennsylvania